Keckley is a surname. Notable people with the surname include:

Elizabeth Keckley (1818–1907), former slave, seamstress, civil activist, and author
Jane Keckley (1876–1963), American actress

See also
Keckler